"You Again", sometimes referred to as "(I'd Choose) You Again", is a song written by Paul Overstreet and Don Schlitz, and recorded by American country music group The Forester Sisters.  It was released in June 1987 as the second single and title track from the album You Again.  The single went to number one for one week and spent a total of fourteen weeks within the top 40, and was their fourth and final number one single.

Charts

Weekly charts

Year-end charts

References

1987 singles
The Forester Sisters songs
Songs written by Paul Overstreet
Songs written by Don Schlitz
Song recordings produced by Barry Beckett
Song recordings produced by James Stroud
Warner Records singles
1987 songs